The following is a partial list of roads in Malawi, under the jurisdiction of the Road Authority of Malawi.

See also
Transport in Malawi

References

Roads in Malawi
Transport in Malawi
Economy of Malawi
Malawi
Roads
Roads